Breviraja spinosa, commonly known as the spinose skate, is a species of ray in the family Rajidae.

References

John D. McEachran and Richard E. Matheson, Jr., Polychromatism and Polymorphism in Breviraja spinosa (Elasmobranchii, Rajiformes), with Description of Three New Species, Copeia, Vol. 1985, No. 4 (Dec. 10, 1985), pp. 1035-1052.

spinose skate
Fauna of the Southeastern United States
Fish of the Caribbean
Taxa named by Henry Bryant Bigelow
Taxa named by William Charles Schroeder
spinose skate